Lise Bourgault (born June 5, 1950) is a Canadian politician. Since 2003, she has been the mayor of Brownsburg-Chatham, Quebec.

Bourgault was born in St-Pamphile, Quebec. She was elected to the House of Commons of Canada for the riding of Argenteuil—Papineau in the 1984 federal election. A Progressive Conservative, she was re-elected in the 1988 federal election before being defeated in the 1993 election. From 1987 to 1989, she was the Parliamentary Secretary to the Minister of Consumer and Corporate Affairs. From 1989 to 1991, she was the Parliamentary Secretary to the Minister of National Health and Welfare. In 1991, she was the Parliamentary Secretary to the Minister of Supply and Services. She ran in the 2000 federal election as a Liberal in the riding of Argenteuil—Papineau—Mirabel but lost by 542 votes to the Bloc Québécois candidate.

Electoral record (incomplete)

External links
 

French Quebecers
1950 births
Living people
Members of the House of Commons of Canada from Quebec
Progressive Conservative Party of Canada MPs
Women members of the House of Commons of Canada
Mayors of places in Quebec
Women mayors of places in Quebec